Pourtalosmilia is a genus of small corals in the family Caryophylliidae.

Species
The World Register of Marine Species includes the following species in the genus :

Pourtalosmilia anthophyllites (Ellis & Solander, 1786)   
Pourtalosmilia conferta Cairns, 1978

References

Caryophylliidae
Scleractinia genera